Prof George Francis FitzGerald  FTCD (3 August 1851 – 22 February 1901) was an Irish academic and physicist who served as Erasmus Smith's Professor of Natural and Experimental Philosophy at Trinity College Dublin (TCD) from 1881 to 1901.

FitzGerald is known for his work in electromagnetic theory and for the Lorentz–FitzGerald contraction, which became an integral part of Albert Einstein's special theory of relativity. A crater on the far side of the Moon is named after him, as is a building at TCD.

Life and work in physics
FitzGerald was born at No. 19, Lower Mount Street in Dublin on 3 August 1851 to the Reverend William FitzGerald and his wife Anne Frances Stoney (sister of George Johnstone Stoney and Bindon Blood Stoney). Professor of Moral Philosophy in Trinity and vicar of St Anne's, Dawson Street, at the time of his son's birth, William FitzGerald was consecrated Bishop of Cork, Cloyne and Ross in 1857 and translated to Killaloe and Clonfert in 1862. George returned to Dublin and entered TCD as a student at the age of 16, winning a scholarship in 1870 and graduating in 1871 in Mathematics and Experimental Science. He became a Fellow of Trinity in 1877 and spent the rest of his career there, becoming Erasmus Smith's Professor of Natural and Experimental Philosophy in 1881.

Along with Oliver Lodge, Oliver Heaviside and Heinrich Hertz, FitzGerald was a leading figure among the group of "Maxwellians" who revised, extended, clarified, and confirmed James Clerk Maxwell's mathematical theories of the electromagnetic field during the late 1870s and the 1880s.

In 1883, following from Maxwell's equations, FitzGerald was the first to suggest a device for producing rapidly oscillating electric currents to generate electromagnetic waves, a phenomenon which was first shown to exist experimentally by the German physicist Heinrich Hertz in 1888.

In 1883, he was elected Fellow of the Royal Society. In 1899, was awarded a Royal Medal for his investigations in theoretical physics. In 1900, he was made an honorary fellow of the Royal Society of Edinburgh.

FitzGerald suffered from many digestive problems for much of his shortened life. He became very ill with stomach problems. He died at his home, 7 Ely Place in Dublin, shortly after an operation on a perforated ulcer on 21 February 1901. He is buried in Mount Jerome cemetery.

Length contraction

FitzGerald is better known for his conjecture in his short letter to the editor of Science that if all moving objects were foreshortened in the direction of their motion, it would account for the curious null-results of the Michelson–Morley experiment. FitzGerald based this idea in part on the way electromagnetic forces were known to be affected by motion. In particular, FitzGerald used some equations that had been derived a short time before by his friend the electrical engineer Oliver Heaviside. The Dutch physicist Hendrik Lorentz hit on a very similar idea in 1892 and developed it more fully into Lorentz transformations, in connection with his theory of electrons.

The Lorentz–FitzGerald contraction (or FitzGerald–Lorentz contraction) hypothesis became an essential part of the Special Theory of Relativity, as Albert Einstein published it in 1905. He demonstrated the kinematic nature of this effect, by deriving it from the principle of relativity and the constancy of the speed of light.

Family
FitzGerald married, on 21 December 1885, Harriette Mary, daughter of the Reverend John Hewitt Jellett, Provost of TCD and Dorothea Morris Morgan. He had eight children by her, three sons and five daughters.

FitzGerald was the nephew of George Johnstone Stoney, the Irish physicist who coined the term "electron". After the particles were discovered by J. J. Thomson and Walter Kaufmann in 1896, FitzGerald was the one to propose calling them electrons. FitzGerald was also the nephew of Bindon Blood Stoney, an eminent Irish engineer. His cousin was Edith Anne Stoney, a pioneer female medical physicist.

Flying experiments

FitzGerald, in common with others at the end of the nineteenth century, became obsessed with the desire to fly. His attempts in College Park, in Trinity College Dublin, in 1895 involved large numbers of students pulling tow-ropes attached to the Lilienthal glider, and attracted the attention of the people of Dublin, beyond the Nassau Street railings. FitzGerald took off his coat on these occasions, but retained his top hat, which was normal headgear for a Fellow at that time. The experiments were not crowned with success, and were eventually abandoned. The flying machine hung for many years in the Museum Building until an idle engineering student applied a match to the cord from which it was hanging. The flame travelled along the cord and consumed the glider before the helpless onlookers.

References

Bibliography
 Jarret, Philip. "Soaring Inspiration: Otto Lilienthal's Influence in Britain". Air Enthusiast, No. 65, September–October 1996, pp. 2–7. .

External links

 
 
 FitzGerald letters at the Royal Dublin Society, with digitized images of over 2000 letters to and from FitzGerald
 FitzGerald of Kilcarragh – Genealogical Pedigree of George Francis FitzGerald

1851 births
1901 deaths
Academics of Trinity College Dublin
Alumni of Trinity College Dublin
Fellows of the Royal Society
Fellows of Trinity College Dublin
Irish relativity theorists
Presidents of the Physical Society
Royal Medal winners
Scholars of Trinity College Dublin
Burials at Mount Jerome Cemetery and Crematorium